José Luis Aguilera Rico (born 17 February 1979) is a Mexican politician from the Citizens' Movement. From 2006 to 2009 he served as Deputy of the LX Legislature of the Mexican Congress representing Querétaro.

References

1979 births
Living people
Politicians from Querétaro
Citizens' Movement (Mexico) politicians
21st-century Mexican politicians
Members of the Congress of Querétaro
Deputies of the LX Legislature of Mexico
Members of the Chamber of Deputies (Mexico) for Querétaro